Benjamin James Jones (16 November 1919 – 1976) was a Welsh footballer who played as a left-back.

Club career
In 1934, Jones signed for Slough Town. At Slough, Jones played as both a left-back and a winger. During World War II, Jones returned to his native Wales to work down the mines as a Bevin Boy, combining this with playing local football for Rhondda Working Men’s Club. During this time, Jones fell ill and spent six months in hospital. In September 1947, Jones joined Watford. Jones made 158 Football League appearances whilst at Watford over the course of six seasons, including a run of 47 consecutive league games played. In July 1955, following a year long sabbatical from football, Jones signed for Chelmsford City.

International career
In 1947, Jones made two appearances for Wales Amateurs against England Amateurs.

References

1919 births
1976 deaths
Association football defenders
Association football wingers
Welsh footballers
People from Tonypandy
Sportspeople from Rhondda Cynon Taf
Slough Town F.C. players
Watford F.C. players
Chelmsford City F.C. players
Wisbech Town F.C. players
Watford F.C. non-playing staff
Wales amateur international footballers
Bevin Boys
English Football League players